Mission Style may refer to:
 Mission School, an art movement of the late 20th century

Architecture
 Mission Revival Style architecture
 Architecture of the California Missions 
 Spanish Colonial Revival Style architecture
 The architecture of the Prairie School, including Frank Lloyd Wright's 
 American Craftsman
 Craftsman Furniture

Furniture
 Mission Style Furniture
 The furniture and architecture of Gustav Stickley